Savyon Liebrecht (Hebrew: סביון ליברכט; born 13 January 1948) is an Israel author. She was born in Munich, Germany, to Polish Holocaust survivors as Sabine Sosnowski, the eldest of three children. She emigrated to Israel in 1950.

Liebrecht studied journalism in London, United Kingdom, for one year and received a baccalaureate from Tel Aviv University. In 1971, Liebrecht married, and in 1977 she had a daughter and, later, a son.

Works

Her published works include:

 Apples from the Desert: Selected Stories, Feminist Press, 2000 
 A Man and a Woman and a Man: A Novel, Persea Books, 2003, 
 A Good Place for the Night: Stories, Persea Books, 2006, 
 The Women My Father Knew: A Novel, Persea Books, 2010, 
 Horses on the Highway: Stories,Crown, 1988,

References

Sources

 Hebrew Wikipedia
 German Wikipedia

External links
 Institute for the Translation of Hebrew Literature
 Prague Writers' Festival
 LIEBRECHT, SAVYON by Anat Feinberg. Encyclopaedia Judaica article at Encyclopedia.com

1948 births
Living people
Israeli novelists
Israeli women short story writers
Israeli short story writers
Israeli women novelists
Tel Aviv University alumni
International Writing Program alumni
20th-century Israeli women writers
20th-century Israeli writers
21st-century Israeli women writers
21st-century Israeli writers